Following is a list of RLM (Reichsluftfahrt Ministerium) paint designations used by the German Ministry of Aviation from 1933 through 1945.

List

 RLM - 01, SILBER ( silver )
 RLM - 02, GRAU ( grey )
 RLM - 04, GELB ( yellow )  
 RLM - 21, WEIß ( white)
 RLM - 22, SCHWARZ ( black ) 
 RLM - 23, ROT ( red )  
 RLM - 24, DUNKELBLAU ( dark blue ) 
 RLM - 25, HELLGRÜN ( light green )
 RLM - 26, BRAUN ( brown ) 
 RLM - 27, GELB ( yellow )
 RLM - 28, WEINROT ( maroon ) 
 RLM - 61, DUNKELBRAUN ( dark brown ) 
 RLM - 62, GRÜN ( green) 
 RLM - 63v.1, GRÜNGRAU ( green-grey)
 RLM - 63v.2, LICHTGRAU ( light grey)
 RLM - 65, HELLBLAU ( light blue ) 
 RLM - 66, SCHWARZGRAU ( black-grey )
 RLM - 70, SCHWARZGRÜN ( black-green ) 
 RLM - 71, DUNKELGRÜN ( dark green )  
 RLM - 72, GRÜN ( green ) 
 RLM - 73, GRÜN ( green )  
 RLM - 74v.1, GRÜNGRAU ( grey-green )
 RLM - 74v.2, GRÜNGRAU ( grey-green )  
 RLM - 75,  GRAUVIOLETT ( grey-violet )  
 RLM - 76,   LICHTBLAU ( light blue)  
 RLM - 77,   HELLGRAU ( light grey)  
 RLM - 78,   HELLBLAU ( light blue )  
 RLM - 79,   SANDGELB ( sand-yellow )
 RLM - 79,  SANDBRAUN ( sand-brown)
 RLM - 80,   OLIVGRÜN ( olive-green )  
 RLM - 81v.1,   BRAUNVIOLETT ( brown-violet )  
 RLM - 81v.2,   BRAUNVIOLETT ( brown-violet )  
 RLM - 81v.3,   BRAUNVIOLETT ( brown-violet ) 
 RLM -82,   LICHTGRÜN ( light green )  
 RLM -83,   DUNKELGRÜN ( dark green )  
 RLM -84v.1,  GRAUBLAU ( green-blue )  
 RLM -84v.2, GRAUBLAU ( green-grey )  
 RLM -84v.3, GRAUBLAU ( green-blue )

References

External links
 RLM - FS Color LIst

Luftwaffe
German military-related lists